Ruud van der Rijt (born 17 November 1988 in Nijnsel) is a Dutch former professional footballer who played as a defender for FC Eindhoven and Willem II.

External links
 Voetbal International

1988 births
Living people
Dutch footballers
Willem II (football club) players
FC Eindhoven players
Eredivisie players
Eerste Divisie players
People from Sint-Oedenrode
Association football defenders
Footballers from North Brabant